Convoy TAG 19 was a trade convoy of merchant ships during the second World War. It was the 19th of the numbered TAG Convoys from Trinidad and Aruba to Guantánamo. Kapitänleutnant Georg Staats (Knight's Cross) sank two ships from the convoy on 7 November in two approaches aboard U-508.

Ships in the convoy

References

Bibliography

External links
TAG 19 at convoyweb

TAG 19